Talkhab-e Magher (also Romanized as Talkhāb-e Māgher; also known as Qabr-e Qeyşar and Talkhāb) is a village in Bahmai-ye Garmsiri-ye Jonubi Rural District, in the Central District of Bahmai County, Kohgiluyeh and Boyer-Ahmad Province, Iran. At the 2006 census, its population was 11, in 4 families.

References 

Populated places in Bahmai County